Points North Landing is a camp settlement in northeastern Saskatchewan, Canada. It is 355 kilometres north-east of La Ronge, on Highway 905 and has an airport and a water aerodrome, with almost daily flights provided by West Wind Aviation and Transwest Air. Gasoline, diesel, mechanics, a lumber yard, and accommodations are available. University of Waterloo student Kenton Carnegie was killed by timber wolves within this region on November 8, 2005.

It is used as a staging area and logistics area for a variety of activities in northern Saskatchewan. All-weather roads connect the location to the south and temporary winter roads are constructed from Points North Landing to various communities in the North. Several uranium mines are located near this site including Cigar Lake and Key Lake.

History

Points North Landing was founded by George Eikle, a Norcanair pilot, along with his brother and colleagues. The location was chosen as the easiest place to level for an airstrip. The name is descriptive.

References

External links
becquet.ca - Map showing proximity of the Cigar Lake and McClean Lake uranium mines to Points North Landing.
Points North Group

Unincorporated communities in Saskatchewan